Peatrig Hill is a minor hill in Scotland, located about 15 km south-southeast of Edinburgh. One of the Moorfoot Hills, it is located in the parish of Heriot in the Scottish Borders Council Area.

The word rigg means "ridge" in the Old Norse language, thus Peatrig Hill translates as "peat ridge hill".

Other hills in the Moorfoot Hills include Blackhope Scar (651m), Dewar Hill, Garvald Law, Rough Moss (601m).

Other places in the vicinity include Borthwick Hall, Dewar, the Dewar Burn,  the Gala Water, Garvald, Glentress and the Glentress Forest, the Heriot Water, and Stow.

See also
List of places in the Scottish Borders
List of places in Scotland

References

External links
RCAHMS record for Peatrig Hill (Royal Commission on the Ancient and Historical Monuments of Scotland)
CANMORE/RCAHMS record of Peatrig Plantation
Google Books: The anthropology of space and place: locating culture, by Setha M. Low, Denise Lawrence-Zuniga
Peat Rigg Outdoor Training Centre

Mountains and hills of the Scottish Borders